The Robert M. Lamp Cottage, also known as Rocky Roost, was a summer cottage on a small island on Lake Mendota in Madison, Wisconsin. The cottage  was designed by architect Frank Lloyd Wright for boyhood friend, Robert M. Lamp (1866–1916), for whom Wright also designed the Lamp House in Madison.

There was a cottage on the island by 1893, and there is some disagreement on whether Wright had something to do with its construction. By the turn of the century, several cottages were constructed on the small island and it is known that in 1901–02, Wright tied the cottages together into one structure, which is the known cottage for Robert Lamp that appears in postcards and photographs. The cottage was a two-story tall building with horizontal siding and a wrap-around porch on the second floor. In 1902–03, a windmill was added on the island to bring water to the cottage.

Evidence points toward the cottage burning in late 1934 to early 1935. According to Wright scholar, John O. Holzheuter, in "Frank Lloyd Wright designs for Robert Lamp":
A search of newspapers and fire department records for Waunakee (the department that technically should have taken the call) proved fruitless for establishing a date ... Because no taxes were paid on the building for 1935, it can be deduced that the fire occurred after May 15, 1934 and before May 15, 1935.

No physical evidence of the cottage or windmill remains.

References

 Lind, Carla. Lost Wright: Frank Lloyd Wright's Vanished Masterpieces. Pomegranate Communications, 1996, 102-103. 102.
 Storrer, William Allin. The Frank Lloyd Wright Companion. University Of Chicago Press, 2006,  (S.021)

External links
Information about Rocky Roost from "The Wright Library", at www.steinerag.com
Photograph of Rocky Roost at the Wisconsin Historical Society
Photograph of Rocky Roost at the Wisconsin Historical Society

Frank Lloyd Wright buildings
Windmills in Wisconsin
Houses in Madison, Wisconsin